John Grant (22 May 1930 – 23 February 2014) was a Scottish author and illustrator, possibly best known as the author of the Littlenose series of children's stories, which he read on the BBC's Jackanory in 55 programmes from 1968 to 1986.

Grant was born in Edinburgh on 22 May 1930. As a student, he earned extra cash illustrating learned academic papers and designing menus, toast lists and illuminated addresses, and during national service he drew cartoons for the official army magazine Soldier.

He originally invented Littlenose to entertain his children, but failed to find a publisher until BBC commissioned him to both write and present his stories of a little Neanderthal boy who was always getting into trouble. These proved a great success, and he went on to write and illustrate over 13 Littlenose books between 1968 and 1993.

Grant died in Edinburgh on 23 February 2014, leaving his wife Elizabeth, children Euann, Niall, Kirsty and Andrew, as well as six grandchildren.

Books written and illustrated by John Grant 
Littlenose
Littlenose and the Bear Hunt
Littlenose and Two-Eyes
Littlenose Goes South
Littlenose Moves House
Littlenose the Explorer
Littlenose the Fisherman
Littlenose the Hero
Littlenose the Hunter
Littlenose the Joker
Littlenose the Leader
Littlenose the Marksman
Littlenose to the Rescue
Littlenose's Birthday
The Reivers

Books written by John Grant 
Anthony Ant and the Cave Dwellers
Anthony Ant and the Falling Star
Anthony Ant and the Flea Circus
Henry Hound: Henry the Artist
Kidnapped, an adaptation of Robert Louis Stevenson's novel Kidnapped
Masters of the Universe: A Trap For He-Man
Masters of the Universe: Castle Grayskull Under Attack
Masters of the Universe: He-Man and the Asteroid of Doom
Masters of the Universe: He-Man and the Lost Dragon
Masters of the Universe: He-Man Meets the Beast
Masters of the Universe: Skeletor's Ice Attack
Masters of the Universe: The Iron Master
Masters of the Universe: Wings of Doom
Pirates: Adventures on Shark Island
Pirates: Captain Roger's Birthday
Pirates: The Royal Visit
Pirates: Will and the Gold Chase
Princess of Power: Shadow Weaver's Magic Mirror
Princess of Power: She-Ra and the Surprise Party
Storytime for 7 Year Olds
The Adventures of Robin Hood
The Flintstones: Brontonappers
The Flintstones: Fred the Fisherman
The Lonely Lion
Transformers: Autobot Hostage
Transformers: Autobots Fight Back
Transformers: Autobots Lightning Strike
Transformers: Autobots Strike Oil
Transformers: Decepticon's Hideout
Transformers: Decepticons at the Pole
Transformers: Galvatron's Air Attack
Transformers: Laserbeak's Fury
Transformers: Megatron's Fight for Power

References

External links 
 Scottish Book Trust
 
 Obituary (The Scotsman)

1930 births
2014 deaths
Scottish children's writers
Scottish illustrators
Writers from Edinburgh